Thryptomene johnsonii is a species of flowering plant in the family Myrtaceae and is endemic to a restricted area of Western Australia. It is a bushy shrub with rigid branches, egg-shaped leaves with the narrower end towards the base and pink flowers with five petals and usually eight stamens.

Description
There are usually eight, irregularly arranged stamens. Flowering has been observed in October.

Taxonomy
Thryptomene johnsonii was first formally described in 1864 by Ferdinand von Mueller in Fragmenta phytographiae Australiae from specimens collected near the Murchison River. The specific epithet (johnsonii) honours William Johnson (1825–1887) who studied the medicinal properties of the Myrtaceae.

Distribution and habitat
This thryptomene grows in sand on a sandplain slope in the Kalbarri National Park.

Conservation status
Thryptomene johnsonii is classified as "Priority Two" by the Western Australian Government Department of Parks and Wildlife meaning that it is poorly known and from only one or a few locations.

References

johnsonii
Endemic flora of Western Australia
Rosids of Western Australia
Vulnerable flora of Australia
Taxa named by Ferdinand von Mueller
Plants described in 1864